Rochester Thunder was an American soccer team based in Rochester, Minnesota, United States. Founded in 2008, the team played in the USL Premier Development League (PDL), the fourth tier of the American Soccer Pyramid, in the Heartland Division of the Central Conference. The franchise folded at the end of the 2010 season and left the league thereafter.

The team was originally part of the official development system of the Minnesota Thunder former USL First Division franchise. They played their home games at RCTC Stadium on the campus of Rochester Community and Technical College. The team's colors were blue, white and silver.

History
The Thunder joined the PDL in 2009, and played their first ever game on May 9, 2009, away at Des Moines Menace. The Thunder lost game 2–1, with the first goal in franchise history being scored by Brian Pederson.

The team was initially suspended from the USL PDL after their parent team, the Minnesota Thunder left the USL for the new North American Soccer League. However, the team was re-admitted to the PDL in 2010, and continued to compete.

Following the conclusion of the 2010 season the Thunder folded their operations. In a statement released on November 15, 2010 Thunder owner Dan Penz said "Due to unfortunate circumstances, the Rochester Thunder will no longer be able to continue. With the economy the way it is and only a handful of sponsors we could not make it work financially. This is a hard decision, but one that needed to be made".

Players

Notable former players

This list of notable former players comprises players who went on to play professional soccer after playing for the team in the Premier Development League, or those who previously played professionally before joining the team.

  Samuel Asante
  Teal Bunbury
  Juan Chang
  Paul Moran
  Brian Pederson
  Ben Sippola
  Kentaro Takada

Year-by-year

Head coaches
  Neil Cassidy (2009–2010)

Stadia
 Stadium at Rochester Community and Technical College; Rochester, Minnesota (2009–2010)

Average attendance
Attendance stats are calculated by averaging each team's self-reported home attendances from the historical match archive at https://web.archive.org/web/20131208011525/http://www.uslsoccer.com/history/index_E.html.

 2009: 447
 2010: 322

References

External links
Official Site
Official PDL site

Defunct Premier Development League teams
Defunct soccer clubs in Minnesota
Association football clubs established in 2008
Association football clubs disestablished in 2010
Minnesota Thunder
2008 establishments in Minnesota
2010 disestablishments in Minnesota